is a Japanese football player. He is a midfielder currently playing for FC Machida Zelvia.

Personal life 
He graduated with first-class honours in Sports Science from Fukuoka University.

Career

Singapore
He signed for Albirex Niigata FC (Singapore) from the S.League in 2016 after graduation from Fukuoka University. He was signed after Albirex Niigata Singapore chairman Daisuke Korenaga had watched a few of Inaba's games in his university tournaments and called him two weeks after to offer a contract. Inaba had a good season for the team as Albirex became the first team in Singapore to win all 4 trophies on offer in Singapore.

He extended his contract for 2017, becoming only one of six players from last season to remain at the club. Inaba was handed the captaincy of the team for the 2017 S.League season. During the September international break, he was selected to participate in a week-long training stint with his parent club. He traveled to Niigata prefecture with defensive stalwart Yasutaka Yanagi and the duo trained with the first team, playing in a training match against Iwaki FC, a non-J League team. He made 24 appearances in the league and scored two goals as the team retained the S.League title. He also led the team to repeat last season's feat, as the team won all 4 trophies on offer again.

Japan
His stellar performances in the S.League saw Inaba secure a move back to Japan for the 2018 season, signing for J3 League side Kataller Toyama.

Club career statistics
As of 25 November 2022.

Honours

Club 
Albirex Niigata (S)
 S.League (2): 2016, 2017
 Singapore Cup (2): 2016, 2017
 Singapore League Cup (2): 2016, 2017
 Singapore Charity Shield (2): 2016, 2017

References

External links

Profile at Kataller Toyama
 “I wanted to be a footballer, not a salesman": Albirex’s 'De Rossi' chases childhood dream
 No sitting back on Saturday: Albirex skipper Inaba

1993 births
Living people
Japanese footballers
Singapore Premier League players
Albirex Niigata Singapore FC players
J2 League players
J3 League players
Kataller Toyama players
Blaublitz Akita players
FC Machida Zelvia players
Association football forwards
Fukuoka University alumni
Japanese expatriate footballers
Japanese expatriate sportspeople in Singapore
Expatriate footballers in Singapore